Das Ka Dhamki  is a 2023 Indian Telugu-language action comedy film directed by  Vishwak Sen, from a story written by Prasanna Kumar Bezawada. It is produced by Karate Raju, Vishwak's father, under the banners, Vanmaye Creations and Vishwaksen Cinemas. It stars Vishwak Sen, Nivetha Pethuraj, Rao Ramesh, Rohini, Akshara Gowda, Hyper Aadhi, Mahesh Achanta, and Tharun Bhascker. 

The film is scheduled for release on 22 March 2023.

Premise 
Krishna Das and Sanjay Rudra are doppelgangers. Krishna Das is a waiter at a five-star hotel in Hyderabad, while Sanjay Rudra is a rich but kind-hearted doctor, who owns the pharmaceutical company, "SR Pharma Life". Sanjay is developing a cure to cancer in order to achieve his dream of a cancer-free world. When Sanjay mysteriously dies in a car accident, Krishna is asked to take over the responsibility of the company and Sanjay's family for 10 days. This leaves Krishna confused and happy as he can lead a rich life albeit for a short period. However, Krishna decides to investigate the accident and deduces that Sanjay's death is related to his work on the cancer drug.

Cast

Production 
In March 2022, it was announced that Naresh Kuppili and Vishwak Sen would be coming together for a second film called Das Ka Dhamki. However, later in that same month Vishwak Sen  decided to direct the film instead. Filming commenced in March 2022 in Hyderabad. Filming was later completed in February 2023.

Soundtrack 

The film score and soundtrack album of the film is composed by Leon James with one song, "Mawa Bro" composed by Ram Miriyala.

Release

Theatrical
Das Ka Dhamki is scheduled to release on 22 March 2023. The movie was originally scheduled to release on 17 February 2023, but was later postponed due to delay in the visual effects. The worldwide theatrical rights of the film have been sold at Rs 8 cr.

Home Media

References

External links 
 

2023 films
Films shot in Hyderabad, India